The Cherkasy Oblast Council is the regional oblast council (parliament) of the Cherkasy Oblast (province) located in central Ukraine.

Council members are elected for five year terms. In order to gain representation in the council, a party must gain more than 5 percent of the total vote.

Recent elections

2020
Distribution of seats after the 2020 Ukrainian local elections

Election date was 25 October 2020

2015
Distribution of seats after the 2015 Ukrainian local elections

Election date was 25 October 2015

Chairmen

Regional executive committee
 1954–1961 Ivan Lutak
 1961–1963 Ihor Stepanenko
 1963–1967 Stepan Stetsenko
 1967–1973 Mykola Korzh
 1973–1976 Mykhailo Lipko
 1976–1979 Oleksandr Hrytsai
 1979–1991 Volodymyr Shapoval

 1991–1992 Kostiantyn Yastreb
 1994–1995 Vasyl Tsybenko

Regional council
 1991–1991 Volodymyr Shapoval
 1992–1994 Hennadiy Kapralov
 1994–1998 Vasyl Tsybenko
 1998–2001 Volodymyr Lukianets
 2001–2005 Volodymyr Shapoval
 2005–2006 Viktor Pavlichenko
 2006–2010 Volodymyr Hres
 2010–2014 Valeriy Chernyak
 2014–2015 Valentyna Kovalenko
 2015–2018  Oleksandr Velbivets
 2018–2019 Valentyn Tarasenko (Acting)
 2019– Anatoliy Pidhornyy

Subdivisions

Raion councils
 Horodyshche Raion council
 Drabiv Raion council
 Zhashkiv Raion council
 Zvenyhorodka Raion council
 Zolotonosha Raion council
 Kamianka Raion council
 Kaniv Raion council
 Katerynopil Raion council
 Korsun-Shevchenkivskyi Raion council
 Lysianka Raion council
 Mankivka Raion council
 Monastyryshche Raion council
 Smila Raion council
 Talne Raion council
 Uman Raion council
 Khrystynivka Raion council
 Cherkasy Raion council
 Chyhyryn Raion council
 Chornobai Raion council
 Shpola Raion council

City councils
 Cherkasy city council
 Prydniprovskyi Urban District council
 Sosnivskyi Urban District council
 Vatutine city council
 Zolotonosha city council
 Kaniv city council
 Smila city council
 Uman city council

See also
 Governor of Cherkasy Oblast

References

Council
Regional legislatures of Ukraine
Unicameral legislatures